Elk Forest is a residential community out Elk Forest Road, which turns off U.S. Route 119  in Kanawha County, West Virginia, United States. Originally built in the late 1950s-early 1960s, it is a part of Mink Shoals, originally willed for development by Amanda Pitzer at her death, now buried at a small cemetery across the road from Elk Forest along Ventura Acres Road. It is directly opposite Dutch Road, which is a part of the Old German Settlement at Mink Shoals.

References 

Unincorporated communities in Kanawha County, West Virginia
Unincorporated communities in West Virginia
Charleston, West Virginia metropolitan area